CenterPoint Energy, Inc. is an American Fortune 500 electric and natural gas utility serving several markets in the American states of Indiana, Ohio, Louisiana, Minnesota, Mississippi, and Texas. It was formerly known as Reliant Energy (from which it is now separated), NorAm Energy, Houston Industries, and HL&P. The company is headquartered in the CenterPoint Energy Tower at 1111 Louisiana Street in Downtown Houston.

History
When the state of Texas deregulated the electricity market, the former Houston Lighting & Power (HL&P) was split into several companies. In 2003 HL&P was split into Reliant Energy, Texas Genco, and CenterPoint Energy.

Until December 15, 2004, CenterPoint Energy and its predecessors operated in its various markets under these names; they were used separately prior to Reliant Energy, and later in conjunction with the Reliant Energy and CenterPoint Energy names:
 Minnegasco (natural gas throughout Minnesota)
 Houston Lighting and Power (or HL&P) Houston-Galveston electric provider
 Entex (Natural gas throughout South and East Texas, Southern Louisiana and Mississippi)
 Arkla (Natural gas throughout Northern Louisiana, Northeast Texas, Oklahoma, and Arkansas)

In late 2004, four private equity firms—the Texas Pacific Group, the Blackstone Group, Kohlberg Kravis Roberts, and Hellman & Friedman—combined forces to purchase Texas Genco from Centerpoint. Later in 2006, Texas Genco was sold to NRG Energy of Princeton, N.J.

On April 23, 2018 CenterPoint Energy and Vectren Corporation announced they have entered into a definitive merger agreement.

September 2008 power outage

Hurricane Ike caused great disruption of service in the Greater Houston Area, wiping out 2.1 million of CenterPoint Energy's 2.26 million clients' electricity. This was the largest power outage in the company's 130-year history, and the largest in the state's history.

Smart meter pilot program 
In March 2009, the company’s five-year smart meter deployment began, delivering enhanced smart meter functionality to Retail Electric Providers (REPs).
The company worked with the Department of Energy for a pilot program in Texas centered on energy consumption. After working with 500-residential electricity customers in the Houston area, it was found that by using a smart meter, consumers cut down on energy use for the home. The pilot program was funded in part by the $200 million it received from the federal stimulus act.

Electric vehicles

In 2010, CenterPoint Energy and Ford Motor Company formed a partnership to promote adoption of electric vehicles. The two companies teamed up to work together to create electric vehicle consumer outreach and education programs; they also distributed details to various stakeholders about charging needs and the requirements needed to "ensure the electrical infrastructure can support the necessary demand." Additionally: "The Ford and CenterPoint Energy collaboration also includes developing strategies to minimize the emissions and distribution impacts of charging electric vehicles by using statewide system renewable energy resources and more efficient use of household electricity."

2021 Texas power outages

At 1:25 a.m. on February 15, 2021, due to a major cold-weather event affecting the state of Texas, the Electric Reliability Council of Texas (ERCOT) declared a statewide power generation shortfall emergency, due to a 34,000 MW shortfall in generation causing widespread blackouts. At 1:30 a.m., CenterPoint Energy started controlled, rotating outages in the Greater Houston area. At first, the company said that the outages are expected to last 10 to 45 minutes, but soon updated its statement that customers who are experiencing an outage should be prepared to be without power for the rest of Monday. The company also told its customers to temporarily lower their thermostat settings to help conserve natural gas across its eight state service territory.

Overnight on Tuesday morning, CenterPoint Energy was able to restart the process of rolling the outages around, but had to stop at around 4 a.m. due to another ERCOT order because several third-party electric generators tripped offline. However, it was able to restart the process around 1:30 p.m. the same day. Later that evening, CenterPoint Energy stated online that it was given another ERCOT order to reduce electric load and warned customers to make preparations for additional outages.

In Wednesday evening, CenterPoint Energy told its customers to conserve both power and natural gas starting at 6 p.m. CDT until midnight, as it was preparing to re-energize portions of the electric system.  In the early hours of Thursday, the company restored electric service to approximately 1.39 million customers, while less than 7000 customers were about to be restored. Later at around Friday morning, ERCOT ended emergency conditions, saying there is enough generation to go to normal operations.

Criticism
On December 16, 2005, CenterPoint Energy Inc. said it would restate its finances for 2004 and the first three quarters of 2005 to correct accounting errors that overstated revenue and natural gas expenses.

In December 2011, the non-partisan organization Public Campaign criticized CenterPoint Energy for spending $2.65 million on lobbying and not paying any taxes during 2008-2010, instead getting $284 million in tax rebates, despite making a profit of $1.9 billion, and having an executive pay between $12 and $13 million for its top 5 executives.

See also

Deregulation of the Texas electricity market
Electric Reliability Council of Texas (ERCOT)
Sheffield Nelson

References

External links
 CenterPoint Energy web site
 Company timeline

Companies listed on the New York Stock Exchange
Former components in the Dow Jones Utility Average
Electric power companies of the United States
Natural gas companies of the United States
Companies based in Houston